Grand Falls-Windsor—Buchans is a provincial electoral district for the House of Assembly of Newfoundland and Labrador, Canada. Prior to 2006, the district was Grand Falls-Buchans, while expanded slightly in all directions it took in no major municipalities. As of 2011, there are 7,450 eligible voters living within the district.

In the heart of central Newfoundland. Includes part of the town of Grand Falls-Windsor to the north and stretches westward. Badger, Buchans, Buchans Junction, Crooked Lake, Millertown and Red Indian Lake are in the district. Forestry and mining are major industries.

Members of the House of Assembly
The district has elected the following Members of the House of Assembly:

Election results

Results as Grand Falls—Windsor—Buchans

|}

|}

 
|Progressive Conservative
|Susan Sullivan
|align=right|2,767
|align=right|71.83
|align="right"|
|-

|NDP
|Junior C. Downey
|align=right|922
|align=right|23.93
|align="right"|
|-

|}

Results as Grand Falls—Buchans

|}

 
|NDP
|Bryan Blackmore
|align="right"|2,167
|align="right"|43.4
|align="right"|

|-
|}

|-
|}

 
|NDP
|Andrew Barker
|align="right"|449
|align="right"|3.8
|align="right"|
|-
|}

References

External links 
Website of the Newfoundland and Labrador House of Assembly

Grand Falls-Windsor
Newfoundland and Labrador provincial electoral districts